Fábio Augusto Machado commonly known as Fabinho (born 20 July 1984) is a Brazilian footballer who plays for Asreas Itea.

Fabinho began his professional career with Associação Portuguesa Londrinense. He made one appearance with Figueirense Futebol Clube in the Campeonato Brasileiro.

References

1984 births
Living people
Sportspeople from Florianópolis
Brazilian footballers
Brazilian expatriate footballers
Associação Portuguesa Londrinense players
Sport Club Corinthians Paulista players
Figueirense FC players
Avaí FC players
Ionikos F.C. players
Ethnikos Asteras F.C. players
Kallithea F.C. players
Expatriate footballers in Greece
Association football midfielders